In geometry, the symmetry set is a method for representing the local symmetries of a curve, and can be used as a method for representing the shape of objects by finding the topological skeleton. The medial axis, a subset of the symmetry set is a set of curves which roughly run along the middle of an object.

In 2 dimensions
Let  be an open interval, and  be a parametrisation of a smooth plane curve.

The symmetry set will have endpoints corresponding to vertices of the curve. Such points will lie at cusp of the evolute. At such points the curve will have 4-point contact with the circle.

In n dimensions
The symmetry set of the manifold is the closure of the centres of hyperspheres tangent to the manifold in at least two distinct places.

As a bifurcation set
Let  be a parametrisation of a smooth piece of manifold.
We may define a  parameter family of functions on the curve, namely

This family is called the family of distance squared functions.

The symmetry set is then the bifurcation set of the family of distance squared functions. I.e. it is the set of  such that  has a repeated singularity for some 

By a repeated singularity, we mean that the jacobian matrix is singular.

together with the limiting points of this set.

References 
 J. W. Bruce, P. J. Giblin and C. G. Gibson, Symmetry Sets.  Proc. of the Royal Soc.of Edinburgh 101A (1985), 163-186.
 J. W. Bruce and P. J. Giblin, Curves and Singularities, Cambridge University Press (1993).

Differential geometry